The 1884 Chicago White Stockings season was the 13th season of the Chicago White Stockings franchise, the 9th in the National League and the 7th at Lakefront Park. The White Stockings finished fifth in the National League with a record of 62–50. White Stocking 3rd baseman, Ned Williamson set the then major league single season home run record with 27 home runs. After hitting just 13 home runs in 1883, the White Stockings hit 142, the first time that a team had hit 100+ home runs in a season.

Regular season

Season standings

Record vs. opponents

Roster

Player stats

Batting

Starters by position
Note: Pos = Position; G = Games played; AB = At bats; H = Hits; Avg. = Batting average; HR = Home runs; RBI = Runs batted in

Other batters
Note: G = Games played; AB = At bats; H = Hits; Avg. = Batting average; HR = Home runs; RBI = Runs batted in

Pitching

Starting pitchers
Note: G = Games pitched; IP = Innings pitched; W = Wins; L = Losses; ERA = Earned run average; SO = Strikeouts

Relief pitchers
Note: G = Games pitched; W = Wins; L = Losses; SV = Saves; ERA = Earned run average; SO = Strikeouts

References
1884 Chicago White Stockings season at Baseball Reference

Chicago Cubs seasons
Chicago White Stockings season
Chicago Cubs